The Epic of King Gesar ( Tibetan, Bhutanese: གླིང་གེ་སར །), also spelled Geser (especially in Mongolian contexts) or Kesar, is a work of epic literature of Tibet and greater Central Asia. The epic originally developed around 200 BCE or 300 BCE and about 600 CE. Following this, folk balladeers continued to pass on the story orally; this enriched the plot and embellished the language. The story reached its final form and height of popularity in the early 12th Century. 

The Epic  relates the heroic deeds of the culture hero Gesar, the fearless lord of the legendary kingdom of Ling. It is recorded variously in poetry and prose, through oral poetry performance,  and is sung widely throughout Central Asia and North East of South Asia. Its classic version is to be found in central Tibet.

 Some 100 bards of this epic ("tale") are still active today in the Gesar belt of China. Tibetan, Mongolian, Buryat, Balti, Ladakhi and Monguor singers maintain the oral tradition and the epic has attracted intense scholarly curiosity as one of the few oral epic traditions to survive as a performing art.  Besides stories conserved by such Chinese minorities as the Bai, Naxi, the Pumi (Boemi or Tibetans), Lisu, Yugur and Salar, versions of the epic are also recorded among the Balti of Baltistan, the Burusho people of Hunza and Gilgit and the Kalmyk and Ladakhi peoples, in Sikkim, Bhutan, Nepal, and among various Tibeto-Burmese, Turkic, and Tungus tribes. The first printed version was a Mongolian text published in Beijing in 1716.

There exists a very large body of versions, each with many variants, and is reputed by some to be the longest in the world. Although there is no one definitive text, the Chinese compilation of its Tibetan versions so far has filled some 120 volumes, more than one million verses, divided into 29 "chapters". Western calculations speak of more than 50 different books edited so far in China, India and Tibet.

A Tibetan scholar has written:
Like the outstanding Greek epics, Indian epics and Kalevala, King Gesar is a brilliant pearl in the world's cultural treasure and is an important contribution made by our country to human civilization.

Etymology of the name
It has been proposed on the basis of phonetic similarities that the name Gesar reflects the Roman title Caesar, and that the intermediary for the transmission of this imperial title from Rome to Tibet may have been a Turkic language, since kaiser (emperor) entered Turkic through contact with the Byzantine Empire, where Caesar (Καῖσαρ) was an imperial title. Some think the medium for this transmission may have been via Mongolian Kesar. The Mongols were allied with the Byzantines, whose emperor still used the title.

Numismatic evidence and some accounts speak of a Bactrian ruler Phrom-kesar, specifically the Kabul Shahi of Gandhara, which was ruled by the Turkic king Fromo Kesaro ("Caesar of Rome"), who was father-in-law of the king of the Kingdom of Khotan around the middle of the 8th century CE.
In early Bon sources, From Kesar is always a place name, and never refers, as it does later, to a ruler. In some Tibetan versions of the epic, a king named Phrom Ge-sar or Khrom Ge-sar figures as one of the kings of the four directions – the name is attested in the 10th century and this Phrom/Khrom preserves an Iranian form (*frōm-hrōm) for Rūm/Rome.  This eastern Iranian word lies behind the Middle Chinese word for (Eastern) Rome (Fólín), namely Byzantium (phrōm-from<*phywət-lyəm>).

A. H. Francke thought the Tibetan name Gesar derived from Sanskrit. S.K. Chatterji, introducing his work, noted that the Ladakh variant of Kesar, Kyesar, in Classical Tibetan Skye-gsar meant 'reborn/newly born', and that Gesar/Kesar in Tibetan, as in Sanskrit signifies the 'anther or pistil of a flower', corresponding to Sanskrit kēsara, whose root 'kēsa' (hair) is Indo-European.

Gesar and the Kingdom of Ling
In Tibet, the existence of Gesar as a historical figure is rarely questioned. (
Some scholars there argued he was born in 1027, on the basis of a note in a 19th-century chronicle, the Mdo smad chos 'byung by Brag dgon pa dkon mchog bstan pa rab. Certain core episodes seem to reflect events recorded at the dawn of Tibetan history: the marriage to a Chinese princess is reminiscent of legends concerning king Songtsän Gampo's alliance marriage with Princess Wencheng in 641, for example. Legends variously place him in Golok,
between Dotō and Domé,
or in Markham, Kongpo, Tanak, Öyuk or the village of Panam on the Nyang River. Given that the mythological and allegorical elements of the story defy place and time, the historicity of figures in the cycle is indeterminate. Though the epic was sung all over Tibetan-speaking regions, with Kham and Amdo long regarded as the centres for its diffusion,
traditions do connect Gesar with the former Kingdom of Ling.  In Tibetan, gling means "island" but can have, as with the Sanskrit word dvīpa, the secondary meaning of "continent". Ling was a petty kingdom located in Kham between the Yangtze and Yalong River. The Gsumge Mani Stone Castle located near the source of Yalong River houses a shrine dedicated to Gesar at its centre. An historical kingdom of Lingtsang existed until the 20th century.

Growth of the Epic

The success of the Turk Fromo Kesaro, whose name is a Persian pronunciation of "Rome (Byzantium) Caesar", in overwhelming an intrusive Arab army in Gandhara sometime between 739 and 745, may have formed the historic core behind the Gesar epic in Tibet. In the records of the earliest rulers of Ladakh, Baltistan and Gilgit, whose countries were later overrun by incursive Tibetans, royal ancestry is connected to the Bactrian Gesar.

In its distinctive Tibetan form, the epic appears to date from the time of the second transmission of Buddhism to Tibet marked by the formation of the Sarma or "new schools" of Tibetan Buddhism, although the story includes early elements taken from Indian tantricism. The oral tradition of this epic is most prominent in the two remote areas associated with the pre-Buddhist ethnic religion known as Bon (Ladakh and Zanskar in the far west of Tibet and Kham and Amdo in the east), strongly suggesting that the story has native roots. However, the oral versions known to us today are not, according to R. A. Stein, earlier than the written versions, but rather depend on them.

As an oral tradition, a large number of variants have always existed, and no canonical text can be written. However, the epic narrative was certainly in something similar to its present form by the 15th century at the latest as shown by the mentions in the rLangs-kyi Po-ti bSe-ru by Byang chub rgyal mtshan. Despite the age of the tradition, the oldest extant text of the epic is actually the Mongolian woodblock print commissioned by the Kangxi Emperor of Qing China in 1716. None of the Tibetan texts that have come down to us are earlier than the 18th century, although they are likely based on older texts that have not survived. In the late 19th and early 20th centuries a woodblock printing of the story was compiled by a scholar-monk from Ling-tsang, a small kingdom northeast of Derge, with inspiration from the prolific Tibetan philosopher Jamgon Ju Mipham Gyatso.

The wide variety of cultures in which the Gesar epic is encountered means that the name for the hero varies. In Tibetan legends Gesar is variously called Gesar of Ling, Ling Gesar, and Gesar Norbu Dradul. Among the Buryat he is known as Abai Geser Khubun. The Khalkha oral version calls him Altan Bogdo khan. An Altai version calls him Sädängkäi Käsär and Sartaktai Käsär. Among the Balti and Ladakhi people he is most famously known as Gyalpo Kaiserr.

Story and narrative motifs
The epic has a vast number of variants in plot and motifs, but while there is little point in looking for a consistent picture, the core of the story, similar to that of many legendary cycles, has been summed up as follows:
King Ge-sar has a miraculous birth, a despised and neglected childhood, and then becomes ruler and wins his (first) wife 'Brug-mo through a series of marvellous feats.  In subsequent episodes he defends his people against various external aggressors, human and superhuman.  Instead of dying a normal death he departs into a hidden realm from which he may return at some time in the future to save his people from their enemies.

For Samuels, the Gesar epic lies towards the shamanic pole in the continuum of Tibetan culture and religion, which he sees as evincing a constant tension between 'clerical' and 'shamanic' Buddhism, the latter grounded in its earlier Bön substrate.
The received versions of the Ge-sar cycle are thickly overlaid with Buddhist ideas and motifs, and detecting the original 'heroic' form is difficult. Historical analysis to sift out an ancient core narrative winnows the archaic folkloric leitmotifs from features that show distinct and historically identifiable Buddhist influences. Samuel, comparing three Gesar traditions, Mongolian, Eastern Tibetan and Ladakhi, that developed relatively autonomously, postulates the following core narrative shared by all three:

 (1) The Lha gling episode.
 (2) The ′Khrungs gling episode.
 (3) The rTa rgyugs episode.
 (4) The bDud 'dul episode.
 (5) The Hor gling episode.
 (6) The China journey episode.

to which one might add
 (7) The Srid pa'i le'u cosmogenic prelude.

Tibetan versions

Tibetan versions differ very greatly in details. Often Buddhist motifs are conspicuous, with episodes on the creation of the world and Tibet's cosmic origins. In other variants, Gautama Buddha is never mentioned, or a certain secular irony is voiced against the national religion. According to Samten Karmay, Gesar arose as the hero of a society still thinly permeated by Buddhism and the earlier myths associate him with pre-Buddhist beliefs like the mountain cult. In most episodes, Gesar fights against the enemies of dharma, an old warrior ethos, where physical power, courage, a combative spirit, and things like cunning and deceit prevail.

 Cosmic prelude and Tibet's early history: One motif explains how the world collapsed into anarchy; numerous demon kings had avoided subjection. As a result, hordes of cannibalistic demons and goblins, led by malignant and greedy rulers of many kingdoms, wreak havoc. Tibet's conversion from barbarity to Buddhism under the three great Dharma Kings often features. Episodes relate how Padmasambhāva/Guru Rinpoche subdued Tibet's violent native spirits.
 His miraculous or mundane birth: In one account, he was fatherless, like Padmasambhava, who assists his celestial creation by creating a nāginī who then serves the king of Ling, and is impregnated by drinking a magic potion, and is born from his mother's head, like Athena in Greek mythology. In another version he is conceived by his mother after she drinks water impressed with his image. Alternatively, he is born from the union of a father, who is simultaneously skygod and holy mountain, and of a mother who is a goddess of the watery underworld, or he is born, Chori, in the lineage of Ling in the Dza Valley, to the king Singlen Gyalpo and his spouse Lhakar Drönma of Gog.
 Relatives: He has a half-brother, and two uncles: one is the "old hawk", the wise elder of Ling, who supports the child; the other, the cowardly and greedy Khrothung, sees the child as a threat and tries to do him ill. Khrothung fulfils a comic role in the epic, but his role as provocateur is absolutely central.
 His early years: Gesar's mission as a divine emissary is to vanquish powerful demons on earth. Until his adolescence he is depicted as black, ugly, nasty, snotty,and troublesome. His paternal uncle, or the king's brother Todong, banishes both son and mother to the rMa plateau, where he grows up living a feral life, with the child clothed in animal skins and wearing a hat with antelope horns. He comes first in a horserace whose trophy consists of the kingship of Ling. His victory marks his coming of age; as consecrated king, he proclaims himself "the Great Lion, Wish-fulfilling Jewel, Subduer of Foes". He also assumes the name Gesar. Mounted on his miraculous steed Kyang Go Karkar, he subsequently wages military campaigns, together with 30 companions, against the frontier countries that represent evil.

 Horse race and kingship: When he is 12, a horse race is held to determine who will become the king of Ling and who will marry the beautiful daughter, 'Brugmo, of a neighbouring chieftain. Returning to Ling, Gesar wins the race, marries 'Brugmo, and ascends the golden throne. He thenceforth assumes the title "Gesar".
 The kidnapping of 'Brugmo: His first campaign as king is against Klu btsan, the man-eating demon of the north. While away, his wife is kidnapped by Gurdkar (literally: "white tent"), the King of Hor. On his return, Gesar undertakes a second campaign, and uses magic to infiltrate the king of Hor's palace, kills him and retrieves his wife.
 Two further campaigns: Gesar wages war against King Sadam of 'Jang (sometimes located in Yunnan), and king Shingkhri of Mon (Mon is often located in the southern Himalayas and remained the term for "barbarian borderlands" until recently).
 The 18 fortresses: Gesar sets out to conquer the 18 great forts. They are listed differently according to singers and texts, but these battles nearly always include Tajiks and Khache Muslim adversaries.
 Lhasa: Some versions say that, aged 39, he made a retreat on Red Hill, where the Potala Palace was later built.
 Old age: When Gesar reaches his eighties, he briefly descends to Hell as a last episode before he leaves the land of men and ascends once more to his celestial paradise.

Mongolian version (1716)
 Opens with a heavenly prologue, Ge-ser's birth, youth, marriage to Rogmo and his obtaining the kingship of Ling.
 Geser defeats a black striped tiger.
 Geser's voyage to China where he marries a Chinese princess.
 Geser's defeat of the demon king, with the help of the latter's wife.
 Geser's war against the three kings of Sharaigol (Hor)
 Geser's defeat of a demon who assumed the guise of a lama.
 Geser's descent to hell to rescue his mother.

There is a 2017 version of this translated into English.

Buryat version
Buryat versions of the epic focus mainly on Gesar's battles with various demons, rather than on military campaigns. They also contain a detailed and drastically different prologue to Gesar's exploits. According to these versions, the great Tengri Khormusta (Turmas, Khorbustu, Hormust) khan of the celestial tribes of the West waged war with Atai Ulan, khan of the malicious gods of the east. After his victory, Khormusta dismembers Atai Ulan to prevent his resurrection and throws his body parts to Earth, where they become demons and monsters. The act almost causes the extinction of humanity; the middle son of Khormusta (Bukhe Belligte or Uile Butelegcji) was sent from the realm of heaven to undo the damage.

The Buryat version contains 9 branches or song episodes (uliger), each devoted to tell how Gesar defeats an enemy.
 First branch: Gesar's youth. In this branch, Gesar, called Nyurgai (Stinker) and while still in his infancy, defeats three giant rats, human-sized mosquitos and steel ravens (compare Heracles and Cú Chulainn) and marries two princesses, whereupon he assumes his true name.
 Second branch: He marries princess Alma Mergen, daughter of a water deity. He then hunts demonic beasts, born from Atai Ulan's drops of blood. These include a mountain-sized dragon, the keeper of a silver mountain.
 Third branch: He undertakes combat with the great Lord of the Taiga, the giant tiger Orgoli, which was born from Atai Ulan's right hand.
 Fourth branch: He kills a great beast, Arkhan the Sun-Eater, who was born from Atai Ulan's severed head.
 Fifth branch: He wars against Gal Dulme, the personification of volcanic activity, who was born from Atai Ulan's corpse. Because of his youth Gesar is unable to defeat Gal Dulme by himself, and the deed is performed with assistance from his elder brother.
 Sixth branch: He wars against Abarga Sasen, a 15-headed demon born from Atai Ulan's right leg.
 Seventh branch: He wars against Shiram Minata, a demon from the 'Country betwixt Life and Death', who was born from Atai Ulan's left leg.
 Eighth branch: He wages war against three Shirai-Gol khans. This branch seems to be closely related to the Tibetan song about Gesar and three kings of the kingdom of Hor.
 Ninth branch: He campaigns against Lobsogoi, a trickster demon, who was born from Atai Ulan's backside.

There are a number of stories not connected with the foregoing nine branches described above; for example, a story in which Gesar shames Gume-Khan of China, or one in which he exterminates the Four Recklings of Evil, demonic beings whose nature is not quite clear.

Distinctive features of these versions of the Gesar epic have led some scholars to the view that the Buryat and Mongolian versions are not directly dependent on a Tibetan original. Setsenmunkh has argued, and the idea was shared by C. Damdinsuren and B. Vladimirtsev, that the written Mongolian versions stem from one source which has not survived.

Balti and Ladakhi version
This version contains the following seven episodes:
 In Balti version of Kesar epic he is considered to be son of god(Lha Yokpoon) who was sent to Miyul(Earth) to restore peace and stability. 
 According to Balti oral transmission he was born in village Roung yul, Baltistan
 The ancestor Dong-gsum Mi-la sngon-mo, born miraculously, kills a nine-headed ogre, from whose body the land of Ling is born. He fathers eighteen heroes who arrive in gLing.
 dBang-po rgya-bzhin chooses his youngest son, Don-grub, to rule gLing. Dying, he is reborn as a bird, and then as Gog-bzang lha-mo, and is called Kesar/Kyesar.
 Kesar marries Lhamo Brugmo and becomes king of gLing.
 Kesar journeys to China, where he marries the emperor's daughter, g.Yu'i dKon-mchog-ma.
 Kesar defeats the giants of the north, assisted by the giant's wife, Dze-mo.
 While he is away, the King of Hor kidnaps his wife 'Brug-gu-ma.
 On his return, Kesar vanquishes the King of Hor and brings his wife back to gLing.

Similarities with motifs in Turkic heroic poetry
Chadwick and Zhirmunsky consider that the main outlines of the cycle as we have it in Mongolia, Tibet and Ladakh show an outline that conforms to the pattern of heroic poetry among the Turkic peoples. (a) Like the Kirghiz hero Bolot, Gesar, as part of an initiation descends as a boy into the underworld. (b) The gateway to the underworld is through a rocky hole or cave on a mountain summit. (c) He is guided through the otherworld by a female tutelary spirit (Manene/grandmother) who rides an animal, like the Turkic shamaness kara Chach. (d) Like kara Chach, Gesar's tutelary spirit helps him against a host of monstrous foes in the underworld. (e) Like Bolot, Gesar returns in triumph to the world, bearing the food of immortality and the water of life. (f) Like the Altai shamans, Gesar is borne heavenward on the back of a bird to obtain herbs to heal his people. They conclude that the stories of the Gesar cycle were well known in the territory of the Uyghur Khaganate.

The Bhutan versions
The versions of the Gesar epic collected in Bhutan, in publication since 1979, are projected to run into some 31 volumes. His Majesty King Jigme Wangchuck, second Druk Gyalpo (Dragon King) of Bhutan, had individuals read the Epic of Gesar to him nightly.

Oral transmission and performance
According to Li Lianrong,

Jiangbian pointed out that the foundation for the origin of epic is ethnic folk culture. He conjectured that before epics came into being, the Tibetan people "already had a corpus of stories that described the formation of the heavens and the earth, their ethnic origin, and ethnic heroes; these stories provided a foundation for creating the character Gesar, also known as Sgrung in early history. After further polishing by the oral poets, especially the ballad singers, Gesar became a great epic" (1986:51).
Many performers recite episodes from memory or books, while others chant the legendary tales in a state of trance. This last mode bears strong similarities with shamanic practitioners like the pawo mediums and mig mthong diviners.

As an heroic song composed or recited by oral bards, the epic of Gesar has been, for centuries, improvised on, and there is therefore no canonical or monumental version, as one finds in, for example, Greek epic. A given Gesar singer would know only his local version, which nonetheless would take weeks to recite. It has been responsive to regional culture and folklore, local conflicts, religious trends, and even political changes on the world stage. For example, in modern times, when news of World War II trickled into Tibet, additional episodes on how Gesar Conquers the Kingdom of Phyigling 'Jar were composed by 8th Khamthrül Rinpoche (1929–1980), in which Gesar appears, according to some interpretations, to travel to Germany to vanquish the demon-king, perhaps alluding to Adolf Hitler.

Religious dimension
Tibetan history has often swung between centralized and stateless poles, and the epic of Gesar reflects the tensions between central authority, as embodied in religious orthodoxy, and the wild, nomadic forces of the autarkic periphery. There are versions that adopt Gesar as a lama showing him as a tamer of the wild, but, in so far as his epic retains his old lineaments as a maverick master of shamanic powers, he represents the stateless, anarchic dimension of Tibet's margins, and is rather a tamer of corrupt monastic clerics and, thus, it is not coincidental that the epic flourished on the outlying regions of Kham and Amdo. His wars are campaigns of defence against hostile powers intent on subduing the kingdom of gLing, which are often construed as anti-Buddhist. But his vanquishing of the dzongs or fortresses preserves an ambiguity, since these were potential outposts of the state.

Until recently, the tale was forbidden reading in many Tibetan monasteries. In some monasteries, however, rituals invoking Gesar as a major spiritual force are performed. Given the central role the epic played over the centuries in Tibetan folk culture, Tibetan Buddhism has incorporated elements from it and interpreted them in religious terms. The Gelug school disapproved of the epic, while the Kagyu and Nyingma schools generally favoured it, seeing it as an expression of the activity of Padmasambhava and as a vehicle for Buddhist teachings, especially of the Dzogchen school. Consequentially, the question of whether babdrung (visionary Gesar bards) should be regarded as religious practitioners will be answered differently by those who favor and those who oppose the epic; the babdrung  themselves, however, generally emphasize the connection of the epic with the Dharma and see themselves as a kind of religious practitioner.

Orgyen Tobgyal explained that in the Nyingma perspective, "the real nature of the manifestation we know as Ling Gesar is actually that of Guru Rinpoche himself appearing in the form of a drala" (Wylie: dgra bla, "protective warrior spirit").

Chögyam Trungpa, who represented both Kagyu and Nyingma lineages and founded Shambhala Buddhism in the diaspora, inspired by the Greek philosophers of the polis, used the Gesar epic's detailed tales about an idealized nomadic government formed by the Mukpo clan, which constructed a nomadic confederation of imperial reach, to develop a model of a Tibetan polity.

The government of China strongly supports the cult of Gesar and its practice among Han Chinese, according to some as a counter-force to Tibetan Buddhism.

In the region of Baltistan the King Kesar's saga was told in homes, especially in winter, but now it is at the verge of distinction due to availability of the media devices. The region being inhabited by 100% Muslim population, the story was told only for recreational purposes and people would consider that the Kesar was not a human being but "hla hlu", special creatures of God who are given special command and ability by God.

History of Gesar studies
The first printed edition of the Gesar epic was published in Beijing in 1716 in a Mongolian version. It was this text which formed the basis for the first Western-language translation, a Russian version published by the Moravian missionary Isaac Jacob Schmidt in 1836. A German translation followed in 1839. Another Moravian missionary, August Hermann Francke, collected and translated a version from Lower Ladakh between 1905 and 1909. In 1942 George Roerich made a comprehensive survey of the literature of Gesar (Roerich 1942; 277–315)

In the 20th century, other Mongolian Geser texts were edited by scientists like Nicholas Poppe and Walther Heissig.

The first three volumes of the version known as the Lingtsang-Dege woodblock, which was composed in the late 19th and early 20th centuries, were published with a very faithful though incomplete French translation by Rolf Stein in 1956. Stein followed this publication with his 600-page magnum opus on the Tibetan Epic entitled Recherches sur l'Epopee et le Barde au Tibet. This remains the most in-depth study of the Tibetan Gesar tradition. A literal translation of these same woodblocks into English was written by Kornman, Khandro, and Chonam and published by Shambhala in 2012 as The Epic of Gesar of Ling: Gesar's Magical Birth, Early Years, and Coronation as King. A retelling of these volumes in a more accessible and contemporary voice was rendered by David Shapiro and published in 2019 as Gesar of Ling: A Bardic Tale from the Snow Land of Tibet.

The fourth volume of the epic, generally known as The Battle of Düd and Ling was translated by Jane Hawes, David Shapiro and Lama Chonam and published as The Taming of the Demons: From the Epic of Gesar in 2021 (Shambhala 2021)

Another version has been translated into German by Matthias Hermanns (1965). This translation is based on manuscripts collected by Hermanns in Amdo. This book also contains extensive study by Hermanns explaining the epic as the product of the Heroic Age of the nomads of North-eastern Tibet and their interactions with the many other peoples of the Inner Asian steppe. Hermanns believed the epic to pre-date Buddhism in Tibet, and saw in it an expression of the ancient Tibetan archetype of the "heaven-sent king", as found also in the myths of the founders of the Yarlung Dynasty, who founded the Tibetan Empire (7th-9th centuries CE).

The most accessible rendering of Gesar in English is by Alexandra David-Néel in her "Superhuman Life of Gesar of Ling", published in French in 1933.

In occultism
In the occult system of Nicholas Roerich, Gesar is presented as a hero who is believed to accept his physicality in Shambhala. It's told that he would appear with an invincible army to set general justice. Thunderous arrows will be its weapon.
Gesar also has a number of magic attributes: white horse, saddle, horseshoe, sword and lock.

Notes

Citations

Sources

External links

 King Gessar
 King Gessar preserved
 King Gessar and Samzhug
 
 Turkish Mythology Dictionary - Multilingual (English)
 An 1835 German translation of the Mongolian version at the Internet Archive
 The Mongolian version in Mongolian (Khalkha Cyrillic)
 The Buryat version in Russian translation

12th-century poems
Bon
Epic poems
Intangible Cultural Heritage of Humanity
Mongol mythology
Mongolian literature
Tibetan Buddhist texts
Tibetan mythology
Turkic mythology